Maximilian Conze (born 1969) was appointed Chief Executive of Dyson in 2011. His vision for geographic expansion in Asia and growth of the company's product portfolio has had high impact and in 2016 Dyson recorded a turnover of £2.51bn (up 45% on prior year). Under Conze’s leadership the company is investing 2.5 billion into future technologies. Dyson has 40 new products in development, is launching the Dyson Institute of Engineering and Technology - a new university based in Malmesbury and has an ambition for new battery technology. Conze’s strong belief is "Our lifeblood is inventing and to do this we must aggressively bring in bright young engineering talent."

Early life
Conze was born in the German city of Bielefeld and lived across Germany. He spent two years as a lieutenant in the parachute regiment of the German army before getting his MBA from the Turner College of Business at Columbus State University. After graduation, Conze joined Procter & Gamble.

Career

Procter & Gamble
Conze worked for Procter & Gamble, for 17 years (1993-2010), eventually becoming Marketing Director of Global Skincare from 2000 to 2001. At P&G, he also held the role of Senior Marketing Director of Beauty in Greater China from 2004 to 2007. Following stints in the UK, Switzerland, US and China, he left P&G as Managing Director of DACH in 2010. For Conze this experience taught him the importance of innovation and geographic breadth.

Dyson
Conze joined Dyson as President, North America in 2010 and in September 2011 Conze succeeded Martin McCourt as Chief Executive Officer of Dyson. He had been inspired by James Dyson’s story and the two operated hand in hand harmoniously.

Dyson saw its sales revenue doubled and investment in new technology increased to 3 times during Max’s term. Conze ran a group with more than 4,400 employees around the world including the UK head office; a Malaysian factory where the bulk of production is carried out, a second technology campus named Hullavington in Malmesbury and a new motor facility in Singapore. Under Conze’s leadership, Dyson experienced strong growth and entered new categories.

2016 saw the launch of the Dyson Supersonic hair dryer, the Dyson V8 cord-free vacuum and the introduction of the Dyson Demo shop. Dyson's then-CEO Max Conze said, “2016 was one of our best years yet, driven by new technology and international growth. Our future is best understood by looking at the new Dyson demo stores. They get people hands-on with Dyson machines to understand the intelligent technology inside.”

Conze led Dyson through a period of expansion, announcing the new Hullavington campus in February 2017 as a part of plans to increase the company’s workforce of engineers and scientists to around 7000 in the next five years.

In March 2017, Dyson revealed that its profits for 2016 topped £630 million after company recorded a 244 percent growth in China markets. Dyson announced a £1.5bn investment into research and development of future technologies. The plan was rooted in an ongoing expansion of Dyson engineering, working with universities to develop a technology pipeline that stretches 25 years into the future. Conze is passionate about the potential of young people and the benefits of recruiting talent fresh out of university, believing that they are more willing to take risks and think unconventionally.

Conze left Dyson under acrimonious circumstances in October 2017.

ProSiebenSat.1 Media SE
Conze joins ProSiebenSat.1 Media SE to the 1st of June as the new CEO. He follows to Thomas Ebeling who left ProSiebenSat.1 on 22 February 2018.

Personal life
Conze is father of two daughters, Lea and Chiara. He lives in Wiltshire, England, and enjoys horse riding with his family, as well as skiing and sailing. He owns a horse, who is also called Max.

References

External links
 Dyson
 Dyson Malmesbury expansion

1969 births
Living people
Businesspeople from Bielefeld